Siena is a city in Tuscany, Italy. It is the capital of the province of Siena.

The city is historically linked to commercial and banking activities, having been a major banking center until the 13th and 14th centuries. Siena is also home to the oldest bank in the world, the Monte dei Paschi bank, which has been operating continuously since 1472. 

Several significant Renaissance painters worked and were born in Siena, among them Duccio, Ambrogio Lorenzetti, Simone Martini and Sassetta, and influenced the course of Italian and European art.

The University of Siena, originally called Studium Senese, was founded in 1240, making it one of the oldest universities in continuous operation in the world.

Siena was one of the most important cities in medieval Europe, and its historic centre is a UNESCO World Heritage Site. From January until the end of September of 2021 it had about 217,000 arrivals, with the largest numbers of foreign visitors coming from Germany, France and the Netherlands. Siena is famous for its cuisine, art, museums, medieval cityscape and the Palio, a horse race held twice a year in Piazza del Campo.

History

Antiquity 
Siena, like other Tuscan hill towns, was first settled in the time of the Etruscans (c. 900–400 BC) when it was inhabited by a tribe called the Saina. A Roman town called Saena Julia was founded at the site in the time of the Emperor Augustus.

According to local legend, Siena was founded by Senius and Aschius, two sons of Remus and thus nephews of Romulus, after whom Rome was named. Supposedly after their father's murder by Romulus, they fled Rome, taking with them the statue of the she-wolf suckling the infants (Capitoline Wolf), thus appropriating that symbol for the town.  Additionally they rode white and black horses, giving rise to the Balzana, or coat of arms of Siena with a white band atop a dark band. Some claim the name Siena derives from Senius. Other etymologies derive the name from the Etruscan family name Saina, the Roman family name Saenii, or the Latin word senex "old" or its derived form seneo "to be old".

Siena did not prosper under Roman rule. It was not sited near any major roads and lacked opportunities for trade. Its insular status meant that Christianity did not penetrate until the 4th century AD, and it was not until the Lombards invaded Siena and the surrounding territory that it knew prosperity.  After the Lombard occupation, the old Roman roads of Via Aurelia and the Via Cassia passed through areas exposed to Byzantine raids, so the Lombards rerouted much of their trade between the Lombards' northern possessions and Rome along a more secure road through Siena. Siena prospered as a trading post, and the constant streams of pilgrims passing to and from Rome provided a valuable source of income in the centuries to come.

Middle Ages 

The oldest aristocratic families in Siena date their line to the Lombards' surrender in 774 to Charlemagne. At this point, the city was inundated with a swarm of Frankish overseers who married into the existing Sienese nobility and left a legacy that can be seen in the abbeys they founded throughout the Sienese territory.  Feudal power waned, however, and by the death of Countess Matilda in 1115 the border territory of the March of Tuscany which had been under the control of her family, the Canossa, broke up into several autonomous regions. This ultimately resulted in the creation of the Republic of Siena.

The Republic existed for over four hundred years, from the 12th century until 1555. During the golden age of Siena before the Black Death in 1348, the city was home to 50,000 people. A major economic centre and among the most important cities in Europe, as well as the main political, economic, and artistic rival of its neighboring city of Florence.

In the Italian War of 1551–59, the republic was defeated by the rival Florence in alliance with the Spanish crown. After 18 months of resistance, Siena surrendered to Spain on 17 April 1555, marking the end of the republic.

Medicean period 
After the fall of the Republic, a few Sienese led by the Florentine exile Piero Strozzi, not wanting to accept the fall of the Republic, took refuge in Montalcino, creating the Republic of Siena sheltered in Montalcino. It lived until 31 May 1559 when it was betrayed by the French allies, whom Siena had always supported, concluding with the Peace of Cateau Cambrésis with Charles V, which effectively ceded the Republic to the Medici.

The House of Medici, apart from the brief parenthesis of Ferdinando I, who tried to create an organized state, were not able to give a stable structure to the Grand Duchy of Tuscany, keeping almost unchanged the division between the so-called Old State, i.e. Florence, and the New State, i.e. Siena and the southern part up to Pitigliano, with different laws and taxes. With the death of Gian Gastone de' Medici, (1737), who had no children, the Medici dynasty ended and the Grand Duchy passed into the hands of the Habsburg-Lorraine dynasty who kept it until 1799.

Late modern period 
After the Napoleonic period and the Risorgimento uprisings, Siena was the first city in Tuscany, in 1859, to vote in favour of annexation to the Kingdom of Italy.

Geography
Siena is located in the central part of Tuscany, in the middle of a vast hilly landscape between the Arbia river valley (south), the Merse valley (south-west), the Elsa valley (north), the Chianti hills (north-east), the Montagnola Senese (west) and the Crete Senesi (south-east).

Climate
Siena has a typical inland Mediterranean climate.

Economy
The main activities are tourism, services, agriculture, handicrafts and light industry.

There is little manufacturing in the city. One exception is the seasonal confectionery industry, which produces local specialities including panforte, ricciarelli and cavallucci at Christmas, and pane co' santi for I Santi on 1 November and I Morti on the following day.

The area has also seen a growth in biotechnology. The Centenary Institute Sieroterapico Achille Sclavo used to be Swiss-owned, operating under the company name, Novartis Vaccines. Novartis developed and produced vaccines and employed about a thousand people. In 2015, the research plant in Siena became part of Glaxo Smith Kline, as part of a deal between Novartis and this firm.

Government

Culture

Contrade

Siena retains a ward-centric culture from medieval times. Each ward (contrada) is represented by an animal or mascot and has its own boundary and distinct identity. Ward rivalries are most rampant during the annual horse race (Palio) in the Piazza del Campo. There are 17 wards (contrada): Aquila, Bruco, Chiocciola, Civetta, Drago, Giraffa, Istrice, Leocorno, Lupa, Nicchio, Oca, Onda, Pantera, Selva, Tartuca, Torre, Valdimontone.

The Palio

The Palio di Siena is a traditional medieval horse race run around the Piazza del Campo twice each year, on 2 July and 16 August. The event is attended by large crowds, and is widely televised. Ten randomly selected from 17 Contrade (which are city neighbourhoods originally formed as battalions for the city's defence) vie for the trophy: a painted banner, or Palio bearing an image of the Blessed Virgin Mary.

Art

Over the centuries, Siena has had a rich tradition of arts and artists. The list of artists from the Sienese School include Duccio and his student Simone Martini, Pietro Lorenzetti and Martino di Bartolomeo. A number of well-known works of Renaissance and High Renaissance art still remain in galleries or churches in Siena.

The Church of San Domenico contains art by Guido da Siena, dating to the mid-13th century. Duccio's Maestà, which was commissioned by the City of Siena in 1308, was instrumental in leading Italian painting away from the hieratic representations of Byzantine art and directing it towards more direct presentations of reality. And his Madonna and Child with Saints polyptych, painted between 1311 and 1318, remains at the city's Pinacoteca Nazionale.

The Pinacoteca also includes several works by Domenico Beccafumi, as well as art by Lorenzo Lotto, Domenico di Bartolo and Fra Bartolomeo.

Main sights

The Siena Cathedral (Duomo), begun in the 12th century, is a masterpiece of Italian Romanesque–Gothic architecture. Its main façade was completed in 1380 with a nave oriented northeast–southwest. A proposed expansion of the eastern transept would have transformed the church into an ambitiously massive basilica, the largest then in the world, with an east–west nave. However, the scarcity of funds, in part due to war and the Black Death, truncated the project. Two walls of this expanded eastern transept remain; through an internal staircase, visitors can climb for a grand view of the city.

The Siena Cathedral Pulpit is an octagonal 13th-century masterpiece sculpted by Nicola Pisano with lion pedestals and biblical bas-relief panels. The inlaid marble mosaic floor of the cathedral, designed and laboured on by many artists, is among the most elaborate in Italy. The Sacristy and Piccolomini library have well-preserved Renaissance frescos by Ghirlandaio and Pinturicchio respectively. Other sculptors active in the church and in the subterranean baptistry are Donatello, Lorenzo Ghiberti, Jacopo della Quercia and others. The Museo dell'Opera del Duomo contains Duccio's famous Maestà (1308–11) and various other works by Sienese masters. More Sienese paintings are to be found in the Pinacoteca, e.g. 13th-century works by Dietisalvi di Speme.

The Piazza del Campo, the shell-shaped town square, unfurls before the Palazzo Pubblico with its tall Torre del Mangia. This is part of the site for the Palio horse race. The Palazzo Pubblico, itself a great work of architecture, houses yet another important art museum. Included within the museum is Ambrogio Lorenzetti's frescoes depicting the Allegory and Effects of Good and Bad Government and also some of the finest frescoes of Simone Martini and Pietro Lorenzetti.

The Palazzo Salimbeni, located in a piazza of the same name, was the original headquarters and remains in possession of the Monte dei Paschi di Siena, one of the oldest banks in continuous existence in Europe.

Housed in the notable Gothic Palazzo Chigi-Saracini on Via di Città is the Accademia Musicale Chigiana, Siena's conservatory of music.

Other churches in the city include:
 Basilica dell'Osservanza
 San Domenico
 San Francesco
 San Martino
 Santa Maria dei Servi
 Santa Petronilla
 Santi Niccolo e Lucia
 Santo Spirito
 Sant'Andrea Apostolo
 Sanctuary of Santa Caterina, incorporating the old house of St. Catherine of Siena. It houses the miraculous Crucifix (late 12th century) from which the saint received her stigmata, and a 15th-century statue of St. Catherine.

The historic Siena synagogue is also preserved and open to visitors.

The city's gardens include the Orto Botanico dell'Università di Siena, a botanical garden maintained by the University of Siena.

The Medicean Fortress houses the Siena Jazz School, with courses and concerts throughout the year, and a festival during the International Siena Jazz Masterclasses.

In the neighbourhood are numerous patrician villas, some of which are attributed to Baldassarre Peruzzi:
 Villa Chigi
 Castle of Belcaro
 Villa Celsa
 Villa Cetinale
 Villa Volte Alte

Sports

Football
Associazione Calcio Siena (football) was founded in 1904 and fully established in 1908. It was first promoted to Italy's top league, Serie A, for the 2003–04 season and stayed in this serie for nine seasons. After the club's bankruptcy in 2014, a new club named Società Sportiva Robur Siena took its place and had to restart from Serie D. Currently, it is in Lega Pro league. The club hosts its games at the Stadio Artemio Franchi.

Basketball
The premier society of men's basketball in Siena was called Mens Sana Basket (also referred to by its sponsored name of Montepaschi Siena). It is also the oldest sports society in Siena. Mens Sana Basket participated in the highest level of play in Italy, Lega Basket Serie A, and it has won the national championship eight times, with a streak of seven (2004 and 2007–13). The team host their home games at PalaEstra indoor arena. Like the local football team, the club went through financial issues in 2014, and its place was taken by the new club Mens Sana 1871, currently in the Serie A2 league. The city co-hosted the EuroBasket 1979.

Cycling 

Siena hosts the start and finish of the Strade Bianche, a professional cycling race famous for its historic white gravel roads, called strade bianche or sterrati in Italian. The finish is on the Piazza del Campo, after a steep and narrow climb on the roughly paved Via Santa Caterina leading into the center of the medieval city.

Transport
Buses
Siena Mobilità was a consortium established in 2005, formed by Tiemme Toscana Mobilità, Busitalia Sita Nord e ByBus, to manage the local public transport in Siena, in its province and regional service to Florence and Arezzo. From 1 January 2018 Siena Mobilità operated by virtue of the bridge contract between the Regione Toscana and the company ONE Scarl.

Since 1 November 2021 the public local transport is operated by Autolinee Toscane.

Twin towns

Siena is twinned with:
 Avignon, France
 Concord, North Carolina, US, since 2016
 Weimar, Germany, since 1994
 Wetzlar, Germany, since 1987

Gallery

References

Sources

 A Medieval Italian Commune: Siena under the Nine, 1287–1355  by Professor William M. Bowsky (1982)
 McIntyre, Anthony Osler. Medieval Tuscany and Umbria (1992)

External links

 

 
Populated places established in the 1st millennium BC
Roman sites of Tuscany
World Heritage Sites in Italy
1st-millennium BC establishments
Capitals of former nations
Cities and towns in Tuscany
Tuscany